Morojota (possibly from Aymara muru truncated, quta lake, "truncated lake") is a mountain at a small lake of the same name in the northern extensions of the Carabaya mountain range in the Andes of Peru, about  high. The mountain and the lake located in the Puno Region, Carabaya Province, Ayapata District, northeast of Allincapac.

References

Mountains of Peru
Mountains of Puno Region
Lakes of Peru
Lakes of Puno Region